is a railway station on the Uetsu Main Line in the city of Tainai, Niigata, Japan, operated by East Japan Railway Company (JR East).

Lines

Station layout
The station consists of one side platform and one island platform connected by a footbridge. The station has a Midori no Madoguchi staffed ticket office.

Platforms

History
The station opened on 1 June 1914. With the privatization of Japanese National Railways (JNR) on 1 April 1987, the station came under the control of JR East.

Passenger statistics
In fiscal 2017, the station was used by an average of 1191 passengers daily (boarding passengers only).

Surrounding area
Tainai city hall
 
Nakajo Post Office

See also
 List of railway stations in Japan

References

External links

 JR East station information 

Railway stations in Niigata Prefecture
Uetsu Main Line
Railway stations in Japan opened in 1914
Tainai, Niigata